Quintessence is a French black metal band founded in 2005 in Poitiers, France.

History
Quintessence was founded in 2005 by guitarist Xavier, soon joined by Kriss, Antoine, Démence and Ludo.

The band's music has significantly evolved with time; their first release reminds of the Scandinavian black metal scene with ubiquitous keyboards, which will later disappear thus giving way to heavy metal-influenced guitar solos and more elaborated song structures. Apart from their early demo, all the lyrics are sung in French.

A demo called Black Hordes Unleashed was released in August 2007 under the name Occulta, right before the band changed name for Quintessence and hired a new drummer. This demo, self-released and limited to 200 copies only, consists in 4 tracks reminding many bands from the 1990s, mainly because of the importance of the keyboards and guitar melodies.

V.R. then joined the band as a drummer in the end of 2007 in order to prepare the recording of their first full-length Le fléau de ton existence, released on 28 March 2009 by the Polish label Nija Art, and reissued in April 2010 by the Japanese label Hidden Marly Productions, adding 5 live recordings to the original track list. This album shows a first evolution in the band's music: keyboards have been abandoned and guitar melodies now clearly play the first role, and the production is much more elaborated than on their first release. This is also the first time the band is singing in French, language they will use for all of their later works.

On 30 March 2010, the Mexican label Satanic Records releases a tape called Pictavian Onslaught, which is a split with the French band Valuatir, bringing together songs of each band recorded live during a common gig that took place in May 2009 in the city of Toulouse. Quintessence played at this show songs taken from each of their releases, as well as a Sarcofago cover, Crush, Kill, Destroy. The drums were done by a new member that joined the band in late 2008, Fog, and this concert seems to be the last one performed by the band, according to the statement saying the band no longer performs on stage.

The line-up will then be redrafted, as Démence and Antoine, respectively doing the vocals and bass, didn't take part in the recording of the second full-length of the band released on 16 February 2011 on the French label Armée de la Mort Records. This second album called Le bourreau de Tiffauges is a concept about the life of Gilles de Rais. The vocals, as well as the bass and drums, are done by Fog and the guitars by Xavier and Kriss. This album consists in 7 relatively long tracks, the song writing is more elaborated than on their previous releases, and guitar solos appear sporadically all along the record.

In early 2012, Quintessence has only two members; Xavier and Fog.

A new release seems to be planned for 2012: a split LP with the French band Annthennath called Eram quod es, eris quod sum.

Band members

Current members
 Xavier (guitars)
 Fog (drums, bass, vocals)

Former members
 Kriss (guitar)
 Antoine (bass)
 Démence (vocals)
 V.R. (drums)
 Ludo (drums)

Discography

Full-length albums
 Le fléau de ton existence (2009)
 Le bourreau de Tiffauges (2011)

Splits
 Pictavian Onslaught with Valuatir (2010)

Demos
 Black Hordes Unleashed demo (under the name Occulta) (2007)

References

External links
 Official website

French black metal musical groups
Musical groups from Nouvelle-Aquitaine